Leamington (1853–1878) was a champion American Thoroughbred racehorse and an influential sire in the United States during the second half of the nineteenth century.

Background
Leamington was a brown horse bred in England by Mr. Halford. Leamington was by the top racehorse and sire Faugh-a-Ballagh (by Sir Hercules). His dam was an unnamed mare by Pantaloon who was bred by the Marquis of Westminster.

Racing career

1855: Two-Year-Old Season
Halford began racing him at age two, and then sold him to a Mr. Higgins. Leamington won the Woodcote Stakes at Warwick and the Chesterfield Stakes, before being retired for the year.

1856: Three-Year-Old Season
As a three-year-old, it was planned to run the colt in The Derby, but he contracted strangles, and this affected his whole three-year-old season. However, his owners and trainers appeared to have planned his losses to help keep his handicap weight down. After losing four small races carrying little weight, he won the Wolverhampton, before his losing several more. He was then "allowed" to win the Stewards' Cup carrying only .

1857: Four-Year-Old Season
Leamington's four-year-old season began with the 2.25 mile Chester Cup. Leamington only carried , due to his poor reputation gained as a three-year-old, and he easily won the race. The colt then came fourth at the Ascot Gold Cup. He went on to the Goodwood Stakes, carrying only  with odds of 100 to 3, and easily won the race by a length. His owners won quite a bit of money from wagering on him that day, after their longshot with 100 to 3 odds beat out a field of 19.

1858: Five-Year-Old Season
Leamington only made one start as a five-year-old, carrying  as the handicapper realized how Leamington's owners had been manipulating his races. The weight was too much for Leamington to carry and he couldn't win.

1859: Six-Year-Old Season
Leamigton had a successful start to his six-year-old season, easily winning the Chester Cup against a good field. He finished second in his next race, the Gold Vase at Ascot Racecourse.

In his final race of the season, the Goodwood Cup, Leamington injured his right foreleg.

1860: Seven-Year-Old Season
Leamington trained up for The Whip Stakes, a strenuous four-mile race. He broke down while preparing for the race, and was retired to stud at Rawcliffe Paddocks.

Stud career
Leamington sired 19 winners of 42 races while at Rawcliffe. He was then purchased by the Canadian Roderick W. Cameron for £1,575, and stood at General Abe Buford's Bosque Bonita Stud near Versailles, Kentucky for the 1866 season. He bred only thirteen mares, but produced an outstanding crop of foals, including Longfellow, Enquirer, Lyttleton, Lynchburg, Anna Mace, and Miss Alice.

Cameron then sent the stallion to his own Clifton Stud on Staten Island. He was then moved to New Jersey in 1868, before being shipped to Annieswood Farm in 1871. His offspring were now noted for their speed and included Aristides, the winner of the first Kentucky Derby.

Leamington was sold to Aristides Welch, who stood the stallion at his Erdenheim Stud, near Philadelphia, Pennsylvania. Leamington finished out his life here, dying on May 6, 1878, at the age of 25. During his breeding career, he was the leading sire in North America four times, including leading Lexington in 1875 for the first time in 16 years. He also earned this title in 1877, 1879, and 1881.

Horses sired by Leamington included:
 Aristides (1872) won the first Kentucky Derby and Withers Stakes
 Harold (1876) won 1879 Preakness Stakes
 Iroquois (1878) the first American horse to win Epsom Derby and GB St. Leger Stakes
 Eolus (1868), sire of Knight of Ellerslie (1881), winner of the 1884 Preakness Stakes
 Longfellow (1867) a great sire himself
 Parole (1873) one of the three greatest runners in the 1870s
 Saunterer, won Belmont Stakes and Preakness Stakes

Pedigree

References

 Profile of Leamington at Thoroughbred Heritage
 New York Times obituary for Leamington

1853 racehorse births
1878 racehorse deaths
Racehorses trained in the United Kingdom
Racehorses bred in the United Kingdom
United States Champion Thoroughbred Sires
Thoroughbred family 14